Two ships of the Royal Australian Navy (RAN) have been named HMAS Ipswich, for the city of Ipswich, Queensland.

, a Bathurst-class corvette launched in 1941 and transferred to the Royal Netherlands Navy in 1946
, a Fremantle-class patrol boat which entered service in 1982 and was decommissioned in 2007

Battle honours
Ships named HMAS Ipswich are entitled to carry five battle honours:
Pacific 1942
Indian Ocean 1942–45
Sicily 1943
East Indies 1944
Okinawa 1945

References

Royal Australian Navy ship names